New Mexico State Road 126 (NM 126) is a  state highway in New Mexico, United States of America. NM 126's western terminus is in the small town of Cuba, at U.S. Route 550 (US 550). The route passes through the Nacimiento Mountains and Jemez Mountains, along the southern boundary of the San Pedro Parks Wilderness, then descends past Fenton Lake to the small, unincorporated community of La Cueva (east of Jemez Springs), where it ends at NM 4.

The highway is a part of the Jemez Mountain Trail National Scenic Byway. It is paved near Cuba and La Cueva, but is a graded dirt road for much of its middle section. This section is usually closed during the winter months, and may be impassable for a few days at other times because of muddy conditions resulting from rainstorms.

Major intersections

See also

References

External links

1126
126
Transportation in Sandoval County, New Mexico